Andrea Acciaioli was an Italian noblewoman, as the Countess of Altavilla in the 14th century. Born in Florence she was a friend of Giovanni Boccaccio, and the person to whom he dedicated his book On Famous Women.

Life

Andrea was the sister of Niccolò Acciaioli, the daughter of Acciaiolo, a wealthy Florentine merchant connected to the Acciaioli family of Florence. Her family was an important family of Italy from the twelfth century and associated with banking. She was a member of the court of Joanna, Queen of Naples.  

Her first husband was Carlo d'Arto, Count of Monteodorisio, who died in 1346. Sometime after 1358 and before 1362 she then married Bartolomeo II of Capua, Count of Altavilla. She was described as being of strong moral character, highly educated, and having elegant speech.

Sources

Further reading
 Goldstone, Nancy (2010). Joanna: The Notorious Queen of Naples, Jerusalem and Sicily. London: Weidenfeld & Nicolson. .

Andrea
Nobility from Florence
14th-century Italian women
Court of Joanna I of Naples